The South Carolina Highway Patrol is the highway patrol agency for South Carolina, which has jurisdiction anywhere in the state except for federal or military installations. The Highway Patrol was created in 1930 and is an organization with a rank structure similar to the armed forces. The mission of the South Carolina Highway Patrol includes enforcing the rules and regulations in order to ensure road way safety and reducing crime as outlined by South Carolina law. The Highway Patrol is the largest division of the South Carolina Department of Public Safety and its headquarters is located in Blythewood. This department also includes the South Carolina State Transport Police Division, and the South Carolina Bureau of Protective Services.

The Highway Patrol has many responsibilities. The primary job of the rank and file trooper is traffic law enforcement. This includes traffic collision investigation, issuing warning tickets and citations for traffic violations, and finding, arresting, and processing impaired drivers. A state trooper is a sworn peace officer, and although their primary duty is traffic enforcement, they can perform other law enforcement functions.

Patrol structure
SCHP Commander
SCHP Deputy Commander of Administration
SCHP Deputy Commander of Operations
Field Operations - Region One
Troop One
Troop Two
Troop Three
Troop Four
Field Operations - Region Two
Troop Five
Troop Six
Troop Seven
Field Operations
Troop Eight - Insurance Enforcement Unit
Troop Nine - Multidisciplinary Accident Investigation Team
Troop Ten
Community Relations, Recruiting and Employment Unit
Regulatory Compliance Unit
Area Coordinated Enforcement (ACE)
Training Unit
Central Evidence Facility
Telecommunications
Administrative Operations

Highway Patrol duties

The agency has specific jurisdiction over all South Carolina state highways, U.S. Highways, Interstate highways in the state and all public roads.  Local city police or the counties sheriff's department having a contract with an incorporated city have responsibility to investigate and enforce traffic laws in incorporated cities.  However, the SCHP can still enforce traffic laws on any public road anywhere in the state regardless if it is in an incorporated or unincorporated city. SCHP has authority over any incident that would require a Trooper's response.

SCHP troopers are responsible for investigating and disposing of car accidents, debris, dead animals and other impediments to the free flow of traffic.  They are often the first government officials at the scene of an accident (or obstruction), and in turn summon EMS/Fire (although, their dispatch often does this long before they are on scene), tow truck drivers or SCDOT personnel. The SCHP files traffic collision reports for state highways and within unincorporated areas. The patrol has around 800 employees, of whom 650 are sworn Troopers, and 150 civilians.

Specialized units
The Multi-disciplinary Accident Investigation Team (MAIT): investigates complicated vehicle crashes, using state-of-the-art technology and analysis to reconstruct the scene.
The Civil Emergency Response Team (CERT): responds to civil emergencies using specialized training, tactics and equipment.
The ACE (Aggressive Criminal Enforcement) Team: works specifically to curtail trafficking and transportation of illegal drugs on South Carolina roadways and includes the K-9 Corps, which assists in tracking drugs. Also includes the Motorcycle Unit, and Safety Improvement Team.
The Telecommunications Centers: work dispatching troopers to incident scenes and assist the public with emergency calls.
The Insurance Enforcement Unit: works closely with the Department of Motor Vehicles to identify uninsured drivers and take them off the highways.
Community Relations Office: includes uniformed troopers and civilian staff around the state dedicated to educating the public and media about the Highway Patrol and highway safety.
Governor's Security Detail: works with the State Law Enforcement Division to provide security for the South Carolina Governor and his or her family.
Emergency Management Unit: monitors emergency traffic issues and coordinates hurricane evacuation efforts

Rank structure 
The SCHP uses a paramilitary rank structure.

Demographics
Male: 97%
Female: 3%
White: 85%
African-American/Black: 14%
Asian: 1%

In the line of duty
Throughout the years of the Patrol, 51 Troopers have died performing their duty.

Fallen Troopers

Special programs
Auxiliary Trooper Program
Auxiliary Troopers assist highly trained, seasoned state troopers in enforcement support on daily patrols; to assist with traffic and crowd control at special events; and provide support during natural disasters such as hurricanes.
Auxiliary Troopers receive more than 130 hours of training for certification by the South Carolina Highway Patrol.
To maintain auxiliary status, the Auxiliary Trooper serves minimum of 20 hours per month or 60 hours each quarter of the calendar year.

Fatality Victims Memorial
The Fatality Victims Memorial is a website that families of those persons killed on South Carolina highways can put information about their loved ones.

Child Safety Seatbelt Demonstration

Trooper Public Speaking Program

Vehicles used
The South Carolina Highway Patrol use many different varieties of marked, semi-marked, and unmarked vehicles, like many other law enforcement agencies in South Carolina and the rest of the United States. Most vehicles are a part of fleets, usually late 1990s to as recent as 2010 Ford Crown Victoria or the modified versions of the Crown Vic (as it is commonly called), The Ford Police Interceptor. Also used are 2007 to present Dodge Charger of modified LX and SRT-8 body styles, and starting in 2012, the Ford Taurus and Ford Explorer, and Chevrolet Tahoe. They also used Chevrolet Caprices, Ford Mustang SSP's, and Ford Crown Victorias.

Sidearm
In 2017, the South Carolina Highway Patrol issues the 9mm Glock Model 17M.

Troopers were previously issued the Glock Model 37 .45 GAP and the Glock Model 22 .40 S&W.

The last revolver used was the Smith & Wesson Model 66 .357 magnum which is a derivative of the Smith & Wesson Model 19

See also

 Orangeburg massacre
 List of law enforcement agencies in South Carolina
 State police
 State patrol
 Highway patrol
 Mark H. Coates Highway

References

External links
South Carolina Department of Public Safety
South Carolina Troopers Association

State law enforcement agencies of South Carolina
Government agencies established in 1930
1930 establishments in South Carolina